Hahncappsia nigripes is a moth in the family Crambidae. It was described by William Schaus in 1920. It is found in Guatemala and Mexico.

The wingspan is 28–30 mm for males and 27–30 mm for females. The wings are uniform orange. Adults have been recorded on wing from June to October.

References

Moths described in 1920
Pyraustinae